Hyphessobrycon chiribiquete is a species of South American tetra, belonging to the family Characidae. It is green-gold in coloration. It has a black midlateral stripe running from the base of the caudal fin to the gills. The area of the caudal fin around the base in bright red in coloration, as is the anal fin. It is known to inhabit the Japurá and Ucayali River Basins. It was discovered in Chiribiquete Park in Colombia.

General references 
 Scientists identify hundreds of species in Colombia’s Chiribiquete Park
 A new species of Hyphessobrycon Durbin (Characiformes: Characidae) from the western Amazon basin in Colombia and Peru

Fish of South America
Tetras
Characidae
Taxa named by Carlos A. García-Alzate
Fish described in 2020